The Brilliance H230 sedan and Brilliance H220 hatchback duo are subcompact cars (B) produced by Chinese automobile manufacturer Brilliance Auto positioned under the Brilliance H330 and Brilliance H320 compact cars.

Brilliance H230 and H230EV
The Brilliance H230 sedan was launched on the Chinese car market in August 2012 as the base for the H220 hatchback and the later revealed H230EV sedan. The H230EV sedan is the electric version of the H230 subcompact sedan with prices starting from 179,800.

Brilliance H220
The Brilliance H220 hatchback was launched on the China car market in November 2013 sharing everything in front of the C-pillars with the Brilliance H230 subcompact sedan. Prices starts from 54,800 yuan to 67,800 yuan.

References

External links

Brilliance H230EV website

H230
Cars of China
Subcompact cars
2010s cars
Front-wheel-drive vehicles
Cars introduced in 2012